Rafael Devers Calcaño (born October 24, 1996) is a Dominican professional baseball third baseman for the Boston Red Sox of Major League Baseball (MLB). He made his MLB debut in 2017, and was an All-Star in 2021 and 2022.

Career
The Red Sox signed 16-year-old free agent Devers in August 2013. Devers, who ranked sixth overall among the top 50 international prospects, agreed to a $1.5 million deal.  According to an MLB.com report, he was at the time considered by some scouts to be the best left-handed hitter available on the international market.

Minor leagues
Devers made his professional debut on May 31, 2014, with the Dominican Summer League Red Sox rookie club. He batted 14-for-30 for a .467 batting average and slugged .800 in eight games. In June he continued to show his value leading the DSL Sox with a slash line of .337/.445/.538, three home runs and 21 runs batted in (RBIs), walking more times (21) than he struck out (20), while playing in all 28 of the team's games thus far and had reached base in all but one. In addition, his .983 on-base plus slugging statistic was rare for the DSL level, while his .533 slugging average in this period is the highest mark for an everyday player for the Red Sox since at least 2005, which is as far back as online statistics for the DSL go. On July 3, he was promoted to the Gulf Coast League Red Sox of the Rookie Class GCL. Devers hit .372 and slugged .564 in July 22 games for the GCL Red Sox, including seven doubles, two home runs, 31 RBIs, and a .438 on-base percentage. Overall, Devers finished with a .322/.404/.506 line, seven home runs, and 57 RBIs, while appearing in 70 games across two minor league levels. He posted 36 RBIs for the Sox, tying for third in the GCL, and also ranked among the top 10 in batting average (.312). He later contributed with a game-winning homer and three RBIs in the playoffs, as the GFL Red Sox claimed their second Championship title. Additionally, he was named to the 2014 GCL Postseason All-Stars team. He climbed from No. 13 to No. 5 in MLB.com's latest ranking of Red Sox prospects this season.

Devers joined Low Class A Greenville Drive in 2015, where he was selected for the South Atlantic League All-Star Game. Soon after, MLB.com announced that Devers would be member of the World Team roster in the All-Star Futures Game. Devers was invited by the Boston Red Sox to participate on its 2016 spring training. He then was promoted to High-A Salem Red Sox to start the regular season. At the time, he was rated as the Red Sox's No. 2 prospect and No. 14 overall, according to MLB.com.

Devers started the 2017 season with the Double-A Portland Sea Dogs, where he hit .300 with 18 home runs in 77 games. On July 14, Devers was promoted to the Triple-A Pawtucket Red Sox, where he hit .400 with two home runs in nine games.

Boston Red Sox (2017–present)

2017
On July 24, 2017, Devers was promoted to the Boston Red Sox, five days after the team released Pablo Sandoval. On July 26, Devers collected his first major league hit, a home run off of Andrew Moore of the Seattle Mariners. Devers became the youngest Red Sox player (at 20 years, 275 days old) to hit a home run since Tony Conigliaro (at 20 years, 265 days old) in 1965. On August 13, Devers hit a ninth-inning game-tying home run off of Yankees closer Aroldis Chapman. On August 15, while playing third base, Devers initiated a triple play on a ground ball hit by Yadier Molina of the St. Louis Cardinals. During the regular season, Devers appeared in 58 games with the 2017 Red Sox, batting .284 with 10 home runs and 30 RBIs. Defensively, he started 56 games at third base and had a .906 fielding percentage.

In the postseason, Devers hit a two-run home run in Game 3 of the American League Division Series (ALDS) against the eventual World Series champions, the Houston Astros, giving the Red Sox their first lead in any game of the series. Devers became the youngest Red Sox player to homer in the postseason, and only the sixth player in MLB history to hit a home run in the playoffs before his 21st birthday, joining Mickey Mantle, Andruw Jones, Miguel Cabrera, Manny Machado, and Bryce Harper. In Game 4, Devers hit an inside-the-park home run, becoming the youngest MLB player (at 20 years, 350 days old) to hit one in the postseason. During the ALDS, Devers batted 4-for-11 (.364) with two home runs and five RBIs.

2018

Devers began the 2018 season as Boston's regular third baseman. He hit his first career grand slam on April 18, off of Tyler Skaggs of the Los Angeles Angels. He hit his second grand slam on June 30, off of Sonny Gray of the New York Yankees. That night, Devers, who went 5-for-5, became the youngest player to hit a grand slam in a Red Sox–Yankees game, at the age of 21 years and 249 days. On July 12, he was placed on the 10-day disabled list due to left shoulder inflammation; he was activated on July 21. Devers was placed back on the disabled list on July 29, due to a left hamstring strain, and was reactivated on August 8, hitting a home run in that evening's game against the Toronto Blue Jays. Devers was again placed on the disabled list on August 17, due to his left hamstring. He was sent on a rehabilitation assignment with Triple-A Pawtucket on August 29, and returned to Boston's active roster on September 4. On September 26, Devers went 4-for-5 with 2 home runs and 6 RBIs. 

During the regular season, Devers appeared in 121 games, batting .240 with 21 home runs and 66 RBIs. On defense, he led the major leagues in errors, with 24. He also had the lowest fielding percentage among major league third basemen, at .926. He performed much better in the postseason, becoming the fifth player to hit at least three home runs before his 22nd birthday. In Game 5 of the 2018 American League Championship Series (ALCS), Devers hit a go-ahead three-run home run in the sixth inning, helping to send the Red Sox to the World Series. In Game 4 of the World Series, Devers became the youngest player with a go-ahead RBI in the 9th inning or later of a World Series game since Édgar Rentería's walk-off single in Game 7 of the 1997 World Series. The Red Sox won the series in five games over the Los Angeles Dodgers, giving Devers his first championship title.

2019
Devers resumed his role as Boston's regular third baseman for 2019. On June 3, he was named the AL Player of the Month for May, having batted .351 with eight home runs during the month. In mid-July, Devers was named Boston's 2019 Heart & Hustle Award winner. On August 13, Devers became the latest MLB player to record six hits in a game; he was 5-for-5 in the first nine innings of an away game against the Cleveland Indians, and had his sixth hit in the 10th inning. In addition, Devers' four doubles in his 6-for-6 night make him the only player since 1900 to record six-plus hits with at least four doubles. On August 18, Devers became the first MLB player to record 100 RBIs during the 2019 season. He was named AL Player of the Week for the week of August 12–18. On September 21, Devers hit his 31st home run of the season, setting a new Red Sox franchise record for home runs by a third baseman in a season, passing Butch Hobson who had hit 30 in 1977. On September 29, the final day of the regular season, Devers reached the 200-hit plateau. 

He finished the season with 201 hits and a .311 average, along with 54 doubles (leading the AL), 32 home runs, and 115 RBIs, and led the major leagues with 90 extra base hits and 359 total bases. On defense, he led all major league third basemen in errors, with 22. He finished 12th in 2019 AL MVP voting.

2020
During the 60-game shortened regular season, Devers was again Boston's primary third baseman. Overall with the 2020 Red Sox, he batted .263 with 11 home runs and 43 RBIs in 57 games. He led all major league players (including all AL third basemen) in errors with 14, more than twice as many as any other AL third baseman, and had the lowest fielding percentage, .891, of all major league third basemen.

2021
On January 15, 2021, Devers and the Red Sox reached agreement on a $4.575 million one-year deal to avoid arbitration. Devers returned as Boston's primary third baseman, and on July 1 was named the AL starter at that position for the 2021 All-Star Game. On September 4, Devers hit a three-run home run against Cleveland—it was his 33rd home run of the season and gave him 100 RBIs for the second time in his career. Overall during the regular season, Devers batted .279 in 156 games with 38 home runs and 113 RBIs. He also played in 11 postseason games, batting 13-for-44 (.295) as the Red Sox advanced to the ALCS. During Game 2 of the ALCS, both J. D. Martinez and Devers hit grand slams, marking the first time an MLB team had two grand slams in a playoff game. On November 11, Devers was announced as the AL recipient of the Silver Slugger Award for third basemen. He also received votes in American League MVP balloting, finishing in 11th place, and was selected as the second-team third baseman on the All-MLB Team.

2022
On March 23, 2022, Devers signed a $11.2 million contract with the Red Sox, avoiding salary arbitration. He was again the team's regular third baseman. In voting for the All-Star Game, Devers was selected by fans to the AL starting lineup. On July 23, he was placed on the 10-day injured list due to right hamstring inflammation. For the season, Devers batted .295 with 27 home runs and 88 RBIs in 141 games. He was also named a finalist for the Hank Aaron Award, a Silver Slugger Award, and the All-MLB Team.

2023
On January 3, 2023, Devers and the Red Sox agreed to a $17.5 million salary for the 2023 season. On January 11, Devers and the Red Sox signed a ten-year contract extension worth $313.5 million, which will take effect in the 2024 season.

Personal life
Rafael was born on October 24, 1996, to Mr. Devers and Lucrecia Garcia in Sánchez Ramírez Province.

Devers' cousin, José Devers, reached MLB with the Miami Marlins in 2021.

Devers was given the nickname “Carita,” which means “baby face,” because he was so happy and smiling as a child. He used the nickname for Players' Weekend in 2019.

References

External links
, or MiLB.com, or SoxProspects.com

1996 births
Living people
People from Sánchez Ramírez Province
Dominican Republic expatriate baseball players in the United States
Major League Baseball players from the Dominican Republic
Major League Baseball third basemen
Boston Red Sox players
American League All-Stars
Silver Slugger Award winners
Dominican Summer League Red Sox players
Greenville Drive players
Gulf Coast Red Sox players
Leones del Escogido players
Pawtucket Red Sox players
Portland Sea Dogs players
Salem Red Sox players
2023 World Baseball Classic players